Peary may refer to:

People

Last name
 Danny Peary (born 1949), American film critic and sports writer
 Gerald Peary (born 1944), American film critic
 Harold Peary (1908–1985), American actor, comedian and singer
 Josephine Diebitsch Peary (1863–1955), American author and arctic explorer, wife of Robert Peary
 Robert Peary (1856–1920), American explorer

First name
 Peary Chand Mitra (1814–1883), Indian author and journalist
 Peary Rader (1909–1991), American early bodybuilder, Olympic lifter, writer, and magazine publisher
 Peary Charan Sarkar (1823–1875), pioneer in women's education in Bengal

Middle name
 Benjamin Peary Pal (1906–1989), Indian plant breeder and agronomist

Locations

Canada
 Peary Bay, in Nunavut
 Peary Channel, a waterway in Nunavut

Greenland
 Cape Peary, a headland in northwestern Greenland
 Mary Peary Peaks, a mountain in northern Greenland
 Peary Channel (Greenland), a hypothetical sound in Northern Greenland
 Peary Glacier, a glacier in western Greenland
 Peary Land, a peninsula in northern Greenland
 Peary Nunatak, a nunatak in eastern Greenland

United States
 Admiral Peary Vocational-Technical School, in Cambria County, Pennsylvania
 Peary, Minnesota, an unincorporated community in Saint Louis County
 Peary, Virginia, an unincorporated community in Mathews County
 Peary–MacMillan Arctic Museum, in Brunswick, Maine

Elsewhere
 Mount Peary, a massif in Antarctic 
 Peary (crater), the closest large lunar impact crater to the lunar north pole

Ships
 Maersk Peary, a Norway-registered tanker landed in 2004
 SS Robert E. Peary, an American "Liberty ship" launched in 1942
 USS Robert E. Peary, or variants thereof, several ships of the United States Navy

Other
 Peary Arctic Club, American-based club that promoted the Arctic expeditions of Robert Peary
 Peary caribou, a caribou subspecies in Canada
 Peary Polar Expedition Medal, authorized by the United States Congress in 1944
 Camp Peary, a U.S. military reservation and Central Intelligence Agency facility in Virginia

See also
 
 
 Pari (disambiguation)
 John Perie
 Perrie
 Perry, an alcoholic beverage made of fermented pear juice
 Perry (disambiguation)
 Pery